Victoria Codona Adolph (1891–1983) was a fourth generation circus performer from the Codonas family.  

She was born in Vera Cruz, Mexico, to French and English parents. She performed in Mexican circuses as a slackwire artist. In 1909, agents of the Barnum & Bailey Circus recruited her and her younger brothers, Alfredo and Abelardo Codona, to perform with them. She worked for Barnum & Bailey until 1918 and also performed in Australia with the Brothers Circus. She was known as Princess Victoria and was a wire-walker.  

She retired from performing when she was pregnant with her first child with William K. Adolph, a race car driver, and they retired to Palm Springs where she died in 1983 at the age of 92.  In 2014, the U.S. Postal Service created a stamp of her as part of an eight stamp collection paying tribute to circus legends of the past.

References

1891 births
1983 deaths
Acrobats
American circus performers
Mexican emigrants to the United States
Burials at Inglewood Park Cemetery